Benzodrocortisone, also known as hydrocortisone 17-benzoate, is a synthetic glucocorticoid corticosteroid which was assigned an  in 2016 and has yet to be marketed.

References

Benzoate esters
Corticosteroid esters
Diketones
Glucocorticoids
Pregnanes
Triols
Enones